Edgar Francisco de León (born 2 November 1964) is a Puerto Rican basketball player. He competed in the men's tournament at the 1988 Summer Olympics and the 1992 Summer Olympics.

References

External links
 

1964 births
Living people
People from Santurce, Puerto Rico
Puerto Rican men's basketball players
1990 FIBA World Championship players
Olympic basketball players of Puerto Rico
Basketball players at the 1988 Summer Olympics
Basketball players at the 1992 Summer Olympics
Place of birth missing (living people)
1994 FIBA World Championship players